Bidesiya may refer to:
 Bidesiya (play), a 1912 play by Bhikhari Thakur
 Bidesiya (film), a 1963 film based on the play